Tomáš Porubský (2 September 1914 – 19 June 1973) was a Slovak footballer who played as a midfielder and appeared for both the Czechoslovakia and Slovakia national teams.

Career
Porubský earned his first and only cap for Czechoslovakia on 23 May 1937 in the 1936–38 Central European International Cup against Italy, which finished as a 0–1 loss in Prague. He later represented the Slovakia national team, making his first appearance on 3 December 1939 in a friendly match against Germany, which finished as a 1–3 loss in Chemnitz. He was capped 14 times for Slovakia, making his final appearance on 13 June 1943 in a friendly against Romania, which finished as a 2–2 draw in Bucharest.

Personal life
Porubský died on 19 June 1973 at the age of 58.

Career statistics

International

References

General references

External links
 
 

1914 births
1973 deaths
Footballers from Bratislava
Czechoslovak footballers
Czechoslovakia international footballers
Slovak footballers
Slovakia international footballers
Dual internationalists (football)
Association football midfielders
FC Fastav Zlín players
Teplitzer FK players
SK Moravská Slavia Brno players
ŠK Slovan Bratislava players
Czechoslovak First League players